Samanatham is the name of a panchayat village in the Madurai district of Tamil Nadu, India. It comes under the Thiruparankundram block."Sama Natham" a corrupt version of 'Samnar Rattham' or 'blood of Jains' is situated about six kilometers away from Madurai and a winding path among acacia bushes and thorns lead to a place worshipped as Mayandi temple. The place is isolated and is located in an eerie environment, but for the 10 foot trident and stone pillars with a hanging bell, there is nothing to suggest that it is a temple.

Conversion of Jains at the point of sword

The villagers and the local boys are acquainted with the history of the place. They describe the place as "Samanar Rattham" or blood of Jains where Jains were persecuted en masse after having been defeated in the fire and water debate with Thirunavukarasar. The place where the pogrom by impalement took place is called as Samanar Medu in Samanatham.

The events recorded in the narrative of Sammandhar are displayed in the five of the twelve festivals in Madurai Meenatchi Amman temple. On these occasions, which are known as impaling festival an image symbolising a Jain impaled on a stake is carried in procession .According to a tradition the villages of Mela Kilavu and Kil Kilavu near Sholavandan are so named because the stakes (Kilavu) for impalement extended so far from the City of Madurai. Edgar Thurston had also suggested the reading of A.Guerinot's 'Essai de Bibliographie Jaina', at Annales du Musee Guimet, in Paris.

See also 
 Impalement of the Jains in Madurai, a Shaivite legend about the killing of around 8000 Jains by the Pandyan king Koon Pandiyan at Samanatham

References 

Villages in Madurai district